The Archdeacon of Maidstone is an office-holder in the Diocese of Canterbury (one of the dioceses of the Province of Canterbury in the Church of England). The Archdeacon of Maidstone is an Anglican priest who oversees the Archdeaconry of Maidstone, which is one of three subdivisions of the diocese.

History
The archdeaconry was created from the ancient Archdeaconry of Canterbury by Order in Council on 4 June 1841.

, the current archdeacon is Andrew William Sewell.
Born in 1961, Sewell was educated at the University of Nottingham, and St John’s College, Nottingham. He was ordained deacon in 1993, and priest in 1994. He served in parishes in the Diocese of Ripon and Leeds until 1998 when he was appointed Priest in Charge of Otham with Langley in Kent, becoming the Rector in 2001. He was Vicar of St Paul’s Maidstone from 2010 to 2020 and an Honorary Canon of Canterbury Cathedral from 2011.

Composition
The archdeaconry covers approximately the north-west and south-west corners of the diocese. , the archdeaconry of Maidstone consists the following deaneries in the Diocese of Canterbury:
Deanery of Maidstone
Deanery of North Downs
Deanery of Ospringe
Deanery of Sittingbourne
Deanery of the Weald

List of archdeacons
4 June 1841 – 1845 (res.): William Lyall
4 December 1845 – 25 March 1887 (d.): Benjamin Harrison
1887–26 March 1900 (d.): Benjamin Smith
1900–1921 (ret.): Henry Spooner
1921–1934 (res.): John Macmillan (also Bishop suffragan of Dover from 1927)
1934–1939 (res.): Karl Sopwith
1939–1942 (res.): Alexander Sargent
1942–1958 (ret.): Julian Bickersteth
1959–1965 (res.): Gordon Strutt
1965–1968 (res.): Michael Nott
1968–1972 (res.): Thomas Prichard
1972–1979 (ret.): Niel Nye (later archdeacon emeritus)
1979–1989 (res.): Michael Percival Smith
1989–2002 (res.): Patrick Evans
2002–13 March 2011 (res.): Philip Down
18 September 201127 September 2020 (res.): Stephen Taylor (on leave 2019–2020; became an Archdeacon without territory and Senior Chaplain to the Bishop of Dover)
27 September 2020present: Andrew Sewell (previously Acting, 30 November 201931 May 2020)

References

Sources

Anglican ecclesiastical offices
 
Diocese of Canterbury
Lists of Anglicans
Lists of English people
Church of England lists